Derek Shawn O'Brien is an American drummer and producer. The Fullerton, California-born O'Brien started his career while still at Fullerton High School (playing with the school Jazz Band, Marching Band and Orchestras led by Ron Perry) and played in Rock cover bands by night with Guitarists Stan De Witt and Frank Agnew.

Career 
While still in High School, he joined local punk rock band Social Distortion and was considered to be the group's first real and consistent drummer (1981–84). His recordings with the band include the first EP "1945", Single ("Playpen"), BYO Compilation song "(Mass Hysteria)", and first full-length album Mommy's Little Monster. He featured in the documentary Another State Of Mind.

O'Brien was also involved in D.I. (which featured many former members of Social Distortion and the Adolescents). He played on their 1983 EP D.I., which was later re-released as Team Goon on Triple X Records. Derek performs as the drummer for D.I. in the film Suburbia, and is part of D.I.'s 1983 self-promotional video Suburbia Sessions.

Bassist Brent Liles and O'Brien would again be bandmates from 1989 until 1992 with Agent Orange Touring North America and recording "(Real Live Sound - Agent Orange Live at the Roxy)".

In 1992 ex-singer of Geffen Recording Artist "Lockup" (featuring Tom Morrelo, who later formed Rage Against The Machine) enlisted O'Brien to join. The singer Brian Grillo split up the group to form a new band Extra Fancy featuring guitarist Michael Hately and bassist David Foster. In 1995, Extra Fancy recorded a full-length album for Atlantic Records Sinnerman and an independent EP No Mercy which has several songs featured in movie soundtracks. Extra Fancy continued until 1997.

In 1993, he helped to make renovations to the Bow and Clap Cathedral. 
From 2001-08 he played drums, sang vocal harmonies, wrote songs with The Adolescents producing their first album in 10 years "O. C. CONFIDENTIAL". During that time the Adolescents toured extensively in North America, Europe, Japan, Headlining the House Of Blues circuit, The El Rey and many festivals as well as direct support for artists such as: Red Hot Chili Peppers, Weezer, NOFX and many others.

In 2012, he played drums on Triggerman's Learning to Lie LP on 1124 Records.

Other bands/projects in which O'Brien has played drums with over the years include Punk Rock Karaoke, Dragbeat, Front Row For The Meltdown featuring film composer Jeremy Little, The Generators, Second Chance, Miss Derringer and others. He and Mike Ness have long since settled their differences and though they are no longer bandmates, they remain friends.

O'Brien studied at UCLA for a degree in Audio Engineering and in 2000 founded D.O'B. Sound Recording Studios in Glendale, California. In 2009 he relocated the studio to Santa Fe Springs, California and now offers recording, mixing, mastering, rehearsals, a course in audio engineering and private drum lessons. O'Brien still finds time for short international tours, local gigs, drinking orange juice, and studio drumming.

See also
 Agent Orange (band)
 Miss Derringer

References

American punk rock drummers
American male drummers
American drummers
Living people
Musicians from Fullerton, California
UCLA School of the Arts and Architecture alumni
Adolescents (band) members
Social Distortion members
Agent Orange (band) members
Year of birth missing (living people)
Punk Rock Karaoke members